Narapally is a village under Pocharam Municipality in Medchal-Malkajgiri District in Telangana, India. It falls under Ghatkesar mandal. Narapally is an upcoming residential and commercial suburban area due its close proximity to Singapore Township and Raheja Mindspace. It is on the National Highway 163.

Residential and Commercial area
Due to its close Proximity to the Information Technology hub of Raheja Mindspace, Infosys SEZ, Singapore Township, Venkatadri Township and very near to the Ghatkesar has made Narapally an Upcoming Residential and Commercial Area. Major Residential Projects are undergoing Construction in and around Narapally

Location / Distance
Narapally is very near to the Ghatkesar and 8 kilometers from Uppal X Road and 1.5 Kilometres from Singapore township and Raheja Mindspace IT Park, Pocharam.

Education
Narapally is a major educational hub with several degree colleges, junior colleges and schools.

It is home to Nalla Narasimha Reddy Engineering College, Siddhartha College of Engineering. 

It has 3 Major schools around it
 
-Rotterdam International School

-Nalla Malla Reddy Foundation School

-Tejasvi Vidyaranya

Transport
Many Buses Ply into Several Colonies of Narapally. TSRTC Buses with Route Number 280 Arrive every 10 Minutes on NH163

Bus
Narapally is well connected by the state-owned bus service, TSRTC. It is well connected with the rest of the city, as it is on connecting road between Uppal and Ghatkesar.

Bank
Allahabad Bank, Narapally

Canara Bank, Narapally.

State Bank of India, Korremula Branch.

References

Bhagayanagar Nandanavanam Park

Villages in Ranga Reddy district